Esteban Andrés Sáez Moncada (born 6 January 1989) is a Chilean footballer who last played for Chilean Primera B side Fernández Vial as a defender.

Club career
With an extensive carrer in the Chilean football, he also had a brief stint with Uruguayan side River Plate in 2013.

International career
He represented Chile U20 at the 2009 South American U-20 Championship. In addition, he was part of training processes of Chile at under-17 and under-23 levels. Also, he was a sparring player of the Chile senior team managed by Marcelo Bielsa.

References

External links
 
 

1983 births
Living people
Footballers from Santiago
Chilean footballers
Chilean expatriate footballers
Chile under-20 international footballers
Chilean Primera División players
Uruguayan Primera División players
Primera B de Chile players
Segunda División Profesional de Chile players
Club Deportivo Palestino footballers
Cobresal footballers
Unión San Felipe footballers
Unión La Calera footballers
Club Atlético River Plate (Montevideo) players
Rangers de Talca footballers
Lota Schwager footballers
Deportes Iberia footballers
Malleco Unido footballers
Deportes Valdivia footballers
Puerto Montt footballers
C.D. Arturo Fernández Vial footballers
Chilean expatriate sportspeople in Uruguay
Expatriate footballers in Uruguay
Association football defenders